French hip hop duo PNL have released three studio albums, one mixtape, twenty-seven singles and twenty-three music videos. In 2015, the duo released their debut mixtape, Que la famille and debut studio album, Le Monde Chico. In 2016, they released their second album Dans la légende, which has peaked at number one on the French Albums chart and sold over a million copies worldwide. PNL's third album, Deux frères (2019), supported by the number one singles "À l'ammoniaque", "91's" and "Au DD". has also topped the chart in France.

Albums

Studio albums

Mixtapes

Singles

Other charted songs

Music videos

References

External links
 Official website
 PNL at AllMusic
 
 

Discographies of French artists
Hip hop discographies